Jane Catherine Ngila is the head of the Chemical Sciences Department at the University of Johannesburg, her work focuses on applying nanotechnology for water purification. She is Acting Executive Director of the African Academy of Sciences and member of the Academy of Science of South Africa.

Career
Ngila obtained her B.Ed. in 1986 and M.Sc. in chemistry in 1992 from Kenyatta University in Nairobi, Kenya. She was awarded a scholarship, AIDAB/EMSS scholarship, by the Australian government. Ngila obtained her PhD in analytical-environmental chemistry from the University of New South Wales, Australia in 1996. She started her career as a tutor in the chemistry department at Kenyatta University in 1989, and was appointed as a lecturer in 1996. She later worked at the University of Botswana (1998–2006) and then as a senior lecturer at the University of KwaZulu-Natal (2006–2011) before being appointed a professorship of applied chemistry at the University of Johannesburg in 2011. Ngila has been a deputy director at the Morendat Institute of Oil & Gas (MIOG), Kenya Pipeline Company.

Research 
Water purification using chemical resins and other adsorbents is a focus of Ngila's research. Ngila is an author or co-author of over 150 papers and review articles. Her current h-index is 23.

Awards and honors
 2016 African Union Kwame Nkrumah Award for Scientific Excellence
2021 L'Oréal-UNESCO For Women in Science Award

References

External links
 
 

Kenyatta University alumni
21st-century chemists
Fellows of the African Academy of Sciences
Members of the Academy of Science of South Africa
Living people
21st-century Kenyan women scientists
21st-century Kenyan scientists
University of New South Wales alumni
Year of birth missing (living people)
Kenyan chemists
Women chemists